Maksim Siarheyeu (born 15 July 1991 in Vitebsk) is a Belorussian male short track speed skater.

References

External links
Maksim Siarheyeu's profile (retrieved 2014-06-14)

1991 births
Living people
Belarusian male short track speed skaters
Olympic short track speed skaters of Belarus
Short track speed skaters at the 2014 Winter Olympics
Short track speed skaters at the 2018 Winter Olympics
Sportspeople from Vitebsk